Sir William Agnew, 1st Baronet (20 October 1825 – 31 October 1910) was an English politician and art dealer.  Thomas Agnew & Sons, his London art business in Mayfair flourished as one of the leading art dealerships in London from 1860, until it closed in April 2013, still with the Agnew family involved, and still known as "Agnew's Gallery", or more informally "Agnew's".

Career
In the middle of the 1860s, Agnew and his brother Thomas provided much needed financial backing to the publishing firm Bradbury and Evans, becoming partners in the business. Agnew became a Liberal member of parliament, first for South East Lancashire between 1880 and 1885 and later for Stretford from 1885 to 1886. He was created a baronet, of Great Stanhope Street, London, in 1895.

He bought the Rougham estates in Suffolk, England, in 1904.

Family

He was the son of Thomas Agnew (1794–1871) and his wife Jane Garnet Lockett.

On 25 March 1851, he married Mary Kenworthy (before 1836 – 2 September 1892), a daughter of George Pixton Kenworthy. Their children were:
Mary Caroline Agnew, died 2 February 1888
Florence Agnew, died 2 September 1890
Sir George William Agnew, 2nd Baronet (19 January 1852 – 19 December 1941)
Charles Morland Agnew (14 December 1855 – 23 May 1931)
Walter Agnew (29 April 1861 – 17 April 1915)
Philip Leslie Agnew (30 June 1863 – 5 March 1938)

Agnew's present-day descendants include Sir John Keith Agnew, 6th Baronet, of Rougham, and John Stuart Agnew, a parliamentary candidate of the UK Independence Party.

Notes

References 
 
 Charles Mosley, ed., Burke's Peerage, Baronetage & Knightage, 107th edition, 3 volumes (Wilmington, Delaware, U.S.A.: Burke's Peerage (Genealogical Books) Ltd, 2003), volume 1, pages 42–44

External links 
 
Sir William Agnew, 1st Baronet, at ThePeerage.com

1825 births
1910 deaths
William
Baronets in the Baronetage of the United Kingdom
Liberal Party (UK) MPs for English constituencies
UK MPs 1880–1885
UK MPs 1885–1886